Crooswijk General Cemetery (Algemene Begraafplaats Crooswijk) is a cemetery in Rotterdam, the Netherlands.

History
As in many countries, burial within city limits became illegal in Rotterdam in 1827. Crooswijk was taken into use in 1832, although the cemetery had not been finished yet. Due to the outbreak of a Cholera epidemic, burial space was needed quickly. In 1915 a new entrance was taken into use. The old entrance still exists.

When the Walloon church was demolished in 1922  the contents of the graves were transferred to the cemetery and a memorial was put in place. When the Laurenskerk was severely damaged by bombing in 1940, many of the graves were also transferred to Crooswijk.

The cemetery is laid out as a park. The cemetery is a general (non-denominational) cemetery. There are sections for casualties of wars, the resistance in the Second World War. There is also a fast-growing Islamic section.

Many of the trees symbolise grief such as Weeping Beech, Silver Birch (Betula pendula var. Tristis, which in Dutch is known as the Weeping Birch), Dutch Elm (in Dutch known as Weeping Elm) and Weeping Willow.

The cemetery is a national heritage site (Rijksmonument) in the Netherlands, as are some of the buildings in the cemetery and are therefore protected.

Notable Burials

 City and port
Many well known people from Rotterdam and families who had companies in the port (the "harbour barons") are buried here.
 Politicians
Gerrit Hendrik Kersten, Minister and politician, founder of the SGP
Yevhen Konovalets, leader of the Organization of Ukrainian Nationalists
Hendrik Spiekman, one of the founders of the SDAP
 From the Resistance
Christiaan Lindemans, double spy
 From the Walloon Church
Pierre Bayle, Philosopher of French origin
Gerard Brandt, Dutch preacher and writer
Pierre Jurieu, Protestant leader of French origin
 War Graves
 4 pilots of the City of London Squadron, who were killed on May 10, 1940, in a bombing raid on the Waalhaven
 Commonwealth War Graves (maintained by the CWGC), including 11 Polish graves
 Dutch Military Field of Honor (Section P), containing 115 graves.
 Other
Frantisek Skroup (1801–1862) conductor at the opera in Rotterdam and composer of the Czech national anthem

Location and visit
The cemetery is located in Crooswijk. The new entrance is on Kerkhoflaan (near the junction with Rusthoflaan).
The cemetery is open daily. A booklet containing a cultural route through the cemetery is available from the office located at the entrance (also contains a map).

Gallery

References

External links
 
 
  Crooswijk General Cemetery on the Rotterdam Municipal website
  Crooswijk General Cemetery on the begraafplaats.org website

1832 establishments in the Netherlands
Commonwealth War Graves Commission cemeteries in the Netherlands
Cemeteries in the Netherlands
Cemeteries in South Holland
Buildings and structures in Rotterdam
History of Rotterdam
Rijksmonuments in Rotterdam
Tourist attractions in Rotterdam
19th-century architecture in the Netherlands